The pair skating event was held as part of the figure skating at the 1952 Winter Olympics. It was the eighth appearance of the event, which had previously been held twice at the Summer Olympics in 1908 and 1920 and at all five Winter Games from 1924 onward. The competition was held on 22 February 1952. Twenty-six figure skaters from nine nations competed.

Results

Referee:
  Walter S. Powell

Assistant Referee:
  Elemér Terták

Judges:
  Donald H. Gilchrist
  Harold G. Storke
  Christen Christensen
  Pauline Barrajo
  Henri Mügeli
  Fritz Schober
  Einar Törsleff
  László Szollás
  Franz Wojtanowskyj

References

Figure skating at the 1952 Winter Olympics
Mixed events at the 1952 Winter Olympics